Andrés Arturo Bertolotti (born 1 September 1943) is an Argentine former footballer who competed in the 1964 Summer Olympics.

References

External links 
 

1943 births
Living people
Association football defenders
Argentine footballers
Olympic footballers of Argentina
Footballers at the 1964 Summer Olympics
Chacarita Juniors footballers